Lauren Davis (born 1986) is a member of the Washington House of Representatives, representing the 32nd legislative district.

Davis is the Executive Director of the Washington Recovery Alliance, a role she took on after helping found the organization. She has also worked at the Bill & Melinda Gates Foundation and helped develop school suicide prevention programs. She was a Fulbright fellow in Ghana and has taught graduate level social work classes at the University of Washington.

Before entering policy Lauren was a caretaker for a friend, which inspired her to be the citizen co-sponsor behind HB1713, also known as Ricky's Law. The bill was named after her friend.

References

External links
 Official Campaign Site

Democratic Party members of the Washington House of Representatives
Living people
21st-century American politicians
Women state legislators in Washington (state)
21st-century American women politicians
1986 births
Brown University alumni